Carlo Tizzano (born 2 February 2000 in Australia) is an Australian rugby union player who plays for the NSW Waratahs in Super Rugby. His playing position is flanker. He has signed to the Waratahs squad for the 2020 season.

Reference list

External links
Rugby.com.au profile
itsrugby.co.uk profile

2000 births
Australian people of Italian descent
Australian rugby union players
Living people
Rugby union flankers
New South Wales Waratahs players
Western Force players
Ealing Trailfinders Rugby Club players